Abba of Carthage was a Jewish amora (scholar), who flourished at the end of the third century CE. His birthplace was Carthage, and it is incorrect to refer his surname to Cartagena in Spain or to a town of Armenia. He is frequently mentioned in the Jerusalem Talmud and in the haggadic traditions.

References

Jews and Judaism in the Roman Empire
3rd-century rabbis
Ancient Jewish scholars
People from Carthage
Year of birth unknown
Year of death unknown
Place of death unknown